Whitewash: The Clarence Brandley Story is a 2002 biographical film directed by Tony Bill and starring Courtney B. Vance. It tells the true story of Clarence Brandley who was wrongly convicted for the rape and murder of Cheryl Dee Fergeson in 1981.

The film was nominated for a NAACP Image Award for Outstanding Television Movie, Mini-Series or Dramatic Special, however it lost to The Rosa Parks Story.

References

External links
 

2002 television films
2002 films
2002 biographical drama films
African-American biographical dramas
American television films
Films set in the 1980s
2000s English-language films
Films directed by Tony Bill
2000s American films